Einar Skinnarland DCM (27 April 1918 – 5 December 2002) was a Norwegian resistance fighter during the Second World War.

Einar Skinnarland was born in Vinje, in Telemark county, Norway.  Skinnarland   graduated from Telemark Engineering College in Porsgrunn.

Skinnarland worked at the Norsk Hydro plant at the Vemork hydroelectric plant, and decided to escape to the UK to help the war effort. He reached Aberdeen with the hijacked coastal steamer Galtesund in 1942, and was soon enrolled as a member of the Norwegian Independent Company 1 under the SOE. He participated as a wireless operator in the Norwegian heavy water sabotage at the Vemork hydroelectric plant, site of the heavy water production at Rjukan Falls in Telemark. He was the first agent to be sent to Rjukan, dropped on the Hardangervidda on 28 March 1942. He had lived near the factory almost all of his life. His brothers and several of his friends also worked at the factory.

Skinnarland moved to Toronto in Canada in 1965 and helped build some of the world's largest dams.

Awards
Einar Skinnarland was highly decorated for his wartime achievements.
War Cross with sword
Distinguished Conduct Medal
Medal of Freedom
Croix de Guerre avec palme

References

External links 
 Obituary : Einar Skinnarland, A real-life Hero of Telemark, The Globe and Mail, February 5, 2003

1918 births
2002 deaths
People from Vinje
Norwegian resistance members
Norwegian military personnel of World War II
Norwegian Special Operations Executive personnel
Recipients of the Medal of Freedom
Recipients of the Croix de Guerre 1939–1945 (France)
Recipients of the Distinguished Conduct Medal
Recipients of the War Cross with Sword (Norway)
Norwegian emigrants to Canada